Sri Siddaganga Composit High School is a private un-aided school and college, giving education from L.K.G. to the II P.U.C. register in Karnataka, India. It is located near to the Davangere District Stadium.

Extra-curricular activity
Extra-curricular activities include sports and Scouts and Guides

References

Schools in Davanagere district
Education in Davangere